Freinville – Sevran is a railway station located on the Île-de-France tramway Line 4 in the commune of Sevran. She is originally commissioned in 1899 by the Chemins de fer de l'Est to serve the Westinghouse Electric Corporation workshops.

References

External links
 

Railway stations in France opened in 1899
Railway stations in Seine-Saint-Denis